This fifth annual Sun Bowl featured the Utah Utes and the New Mexico Lobos in a postseason bowl game for both teams and the final game of the 1938 college football season.

Background
New Mexico was champion of the Border Conference while Utah was champion of the Mountain States Conference. The game was touted as the most evenly matched of the five major bowl games of the 1938 season. This was also the first meeting between the two schools and the first bowl game for either school.

Game summary
Nevertheless, the Utes dominated from the start, scoring three first-half touchdowns, with a Tom Pace touchdown run and two Ray Peterson touchdowns, including a 1-yard run on fourth-down. In the second half, New Mexico had numerous opportunities to close the gap following Utah turnovers but their aerial attack couldn't capitalize, being held to 59 yards passing and four interceptions, not even reaching Utah's 40 the whole game.  Utah, on the other hand, racked up 366 yards rushing, and outgained the Lobos 384–212, adding in a Clarance Gehrke touchdown late to make the final score 26–0, the first ever shutout in Sun Bowl history.

Scoring summary

First quarter
Utah: Tom Pace 15-yard run (Bernard McGarry kick)
Utah: Ray Peterson 60-yard interception return (Bernard McGarry kick)
Second quarter
Utah: Ray Peterson 1-yard run (kick failed)
Fourth quarter
Utah: Clarence Gehrke 10-yard run (kick failed)

Statistics

Aftermath
New Mexico returned to the Sun Bowl twice in the next decade (1944 and 1946). Utah did not return to the Sun Bowl until 2011.

References

Sun Bowl
Sun Bowl
New Mexico Lobos football bowl games
Utah Utes football bowl games
January 1939 sports events
Sun Bowl